A Saturn-crosser is a minor planet whose orbit crosses that of Saturn. The known numbered Saturn-crossers (as of 2005) are listed below. There is only one inner-grazer (944 Hidalgo) and no outer-grazers or co-orbitals known; most if not all of the crossers are centaurs.  is a damocloid.

Notes: † inner-grazer.

 944 Hidalgo †
 2060 Chiron
 5145 Pholus
 5335 Damocles
 8405 Asbolus
 
 20461 Dioretsa
 31824 Elatus
 32532 Thereus
 37117 Narcissus
 52872 Okyrhoe 
 60558 Echeclus

See also 
 List of centaurs (small Solar System bodies)
 List of Mercury-crossing minor planets
 List of Venus-crossing minor planets
 List of Earth-crossing minor planets
 List of Mars-crossing minor planets
 List of Jupiter-crossing minor planets
 List of Uranus-crossing minor planets
 List of Neptune-crossing minor planets

Saturn
Saturn-crossing
Saturn-crossing
Minor planet
Solar System